John Wallowitch (February 11, 1926 – August 15, 2007) was an American songwriter and cabaret performer. He wrote over 2,000 songs; his works include "Bruce", "Come a Little Closer", "I See the World Through Your Eyes", "Back on the Town" and "Mary's Bar". For over 50 years he played and sang a catalogue of original songs at nightspots around New York City. He is also known for his sophisticated takes on the songs of Irving Berlin.

Biography
Wallowitch was born in the Methodist Hospital in South Philadelphia. He attended Edgar Allan Poe Elementary School, Vare Junior High School, Central High School and Temple University in Philadelphia. Wallowitch spent his youth in a desolate neighborhood in South Philadelphia, dreaming about moving to New York. He finally arrived there in his late teens to study classical piano at Juilliard. In order to survive, he played rehearsal piano for shows, among them Leonard Sillman's New Faces of '52, and began to play at the Duplex, a Greenwich Village saloon.

Career
His first professional appearance was on the Lithuanian Furniture Company Radio Hour (Station WHAT) on which he rendered Irving Berlin’s “So Help Me.”

Wrote Stephen Holden in The New York Times: “While Noël Coward is no longer around to set the standards for a certain kind of sophisticated songwriting sensibility, Mr. Wallowitch nimbly carries the torch.” He displays his predilection for Coward-like wit and satire on such songs as “Cosmetic Surgery”, in which he sums up the surgical predilections of friends who are “getting younger than ever” with such dexterity.

In a matter of weeks
With the modern techniques
For improving physiques
They have altered their beaks
And they've lifted their cheeks
And now everyone speaks
In society's cliques
Of the changes that science has wrought
Of the changes that money has bought!

He often wrote about growing up in Philadelphia, and of life with his family. “I See the World Through Your Eyes” is a remembrance of Wallowitch's late brother, photographer Edward Wallowitch, close associate of Andy Warhol. “Manhattan, You’re A Dream” pays tribute to Wallowitch’s mother.

During the 1960s he met three women who would become his greatest champions: singer-pianist Blossom Dearie for whom Wallowitch’s song “Bruce” was a favorite standard; Dixie Carter of Designing Women who recorded a collection of Wallowitch songs in 1984; and Joanne Beretta. Wallowitch’s compositions have also been recorded by Shirley Horn, Tony Bennett, Berri Blair, John Dubois, Marlene VerPlanck, Lynn Lobban, and many others. Among the many fine performers who sing his songs are Lynn Lobban, Alice Levine, Eric Comstock, Yvonne Sherwell, Sue Gandy, Joanne Beretta and Michael Belliveau.

Throughout the 1980s and 1990s, Wallowitch was part of a popular cabaret act with his longtime partner, Bertram Ross.  The pair sang in nightspots ranging from London’s Pizza on the Park to the Ballroom in New York City. A CD of their performance cabaret, “Wallowitch and Ross” (Miranda Music) was released in 2003 to supplement the documentary film of the couple, Wallowitch & Ross: This Moment.

As a solo cabaret entertainer, Wallowitch performed throughout the world and was famous for his long-running hit revue, The World of Wallowitch.  He was the recipient of both the MAC and Bistro Awards for Composer of the Year.

Wallowitch performed and recorded the song “Hillary Oh Hillary,” for Hillary Clinton during her run for U.S. Senate. Henry and Bobbie Shaffner, veteran members of ASCAP, wrote the lyrics and set them to the tune of the old Groucho Marx song, “Lydia, the Tattooed Lady”. Wallowitch and the Shaffners were inspired to write it after Clinton’s six-hour-long visit to Wallowitch's New York studio, where he performed for the former first lady. Later, he translated the Shaffners’ lyrics to Yiddish, to create a version called “Hillary, Oy! Hillary!”

John Wallowitch lived and performed in New York City with his longtime partner Bertram Ross, until Ross's death on Apr 20, 2003.

Wallowitch died on August 15, 2007 in New York City. Wallowitch is buried beside Ross at Kensico Cemetery in Valhalla, New York.

In 2016, Wallowitch & Ross: This Moment was entered into the American Academy of Motion Picture Arts and Sciences film archive for permanent preservation.

During 1989, comedian Chris Elliott would parody Wallowitch on the "Late Night with David Letterman" show portraying the musical character Johnny Graham, who took requests via telephone. They were often prank phone calls.

Discography
 1964: This Is John Wallowitch!!!, LP features cover artwork by Andy Warhol (Serenus Records SEP 2005)
 1965: This Is The Other Side Of John Wallowitch!!!, LP features cover artwork by Andy Warhol (Serenus Records SEP 2006)
 197?: Now appearing at Dreamland Memory Ballroom, LP features cover artwork by Jean Veber (Serenus Records SEPS 22015)
 1984: Back On The Town [LIVE] (DRG Label)
 1993: My Manhattan, featuring Bertram Ross & Dixie Carter (DRG Label)
 1999: Wallowitch & Ross: This Moment. (Music from the Motion Picture) (Karmic Records) 
 2002: Wallowitch & Ross, John Wallowitch & Bertram Ross.
 2008: Miracle On 71st Street, (13 Stories Records) (iTunes)

Wallowitch performed by others
 1983: Dixie Carter Sings John Wallowitch Live at the Carlyle (DRG Label)
 2003: Frankie and Johnny and Me, Lynn Lobban performing John Wallowitch songs (LML Music)
 2007: You're for Loving Sue Gandy and John Wallowitch (Karmic Records)

References

External links
Obituary in the "New York Times"
Obituary in The (London) Times
Jonathan Frank Interview with Wallowitch
A review of Wallowitch's cabaret
The John Wallowitch collection of noncommercial video at the New York Public Library

1926 births
2007 deaths
American male composers
Songwriters from Pennsylvania
American musical theatre composers
Central High School (Philadelphia) alumni
Deaths from bone cancer
American LGBT musicians
Musicians from Philadelphia
Deaths from cancer in New York (state)
20th-century American composers
20th-century American male musicians
20th-century LGBT people
American male songwriters
Burials at Kensico Cemetery